The Jabiru J430 is one model in a large family of two- and four-seat Australian light aircraft developed as a touring aircraft and provided in kit form by Jabiru Aircraft.

Design and development
The J430 is constructed from composite materials. The  span high wing is strut-braced and features winglets. The standard engine is the  Jabiru 3300 six-cylinder, horizontally opposed, four-stroke aircraft engine. The tricycle landing gear has optional wheel pants. Construction time from the factory-supplied kit is reported to be 600 hours. Twenty-five examples were completed and flying by the end of 2011.

Variants

data from Jabiru

Jabiru J200

Jabiru J230
A two-seat version of the J430, designed as a US light-sport aircraft, with a large baggage compartment behind the seats.
Jabiru J250
Model similar to the J450, with the back seat removed to give a large cargo area.
Jabiru J400
Four-seat version powered by a  Jabiru 3300 engine and marketed circa 2004.
Jabiru J430
A four-seater version of the J230 with two seats in the former baggage compartment.

Jabiru J450
Four seat model.
Jabiru SP
Two-seat version for the US light-sport aircraft market, powered by a  Jabiru 3300 engine and marketed circa 2004. The SP has a cruise speed of 
Jabiru UL
Two-seat version for the European microlight category powered by an  Jabiru 2200 engine and marketed circa 2004. The UL has a cruise speed of

Specifications (J430)

References

External links

 
 Jabiru J430 photos

Single-engined tractor aircraft
High-wing aircraft
2000s Australian civil aircraft
J430